Thione may refer to:

Thione (chemistry), the organosulfur analog of ketone
Thione (beetle), a genus in the family Monotomidae
 Thione Seck (born 1955), Senegalese musician